Jānis Eglītis (January 23, 1961 – May 6, 2013) was a Latvian politician and a Deputy of the 9th Saeima. He was a member of the People's Party.

References

1961 births
2013 deaths
People from Preiļi
People's Party (Latvia) politicians
Deputies of the 9th Saeima